Daurio is a surname.  Notable people with the surname include:

 Beverley Daurio (born 1953), Canadian writer and editor
 Ken Daurio (born  1971), American screenwriter

See also
 Dario